Norman F. Carnahan (born February 27, 1942, New Iberia, Louisiana) is an American chemical engineer, a Fellow of The American Institute of Chemical Engineers. He is the Founding Chair of the Upstream Engineering and Flow Assurance (UE&FA) Forum of AIChE.  From 2011 - 2019, he served as the AIChE member on the Board of Directors of The Offshore Technology Conference.

Education

His education in science and mathematics began at St. Pius X High School in Houston, Texas, and continued with engineering and science studies at the University of Houston, where he earned a Bachelor of Science in Chemical Engineering in 1965.  During his undergraduate studies, Professor H. Wm. Prengle guided him in the fundamentals of thermodynamics and equations of state.  Upon graduation, he worked with Dow Chemical Company Research and Development, where he was mentored by Dr. Daniel R. Stull.

In 1968, Carnahan began graduate studies at the University of Oklahoma. His graduate advisor was Professor Kenneth Earl Starling.  During his graduate studies, he was influenced by Professors Sherrill D. Christian, Jack Cohn, Cedomir Sliepcevich, and by correspondences with Berni Alder, Bill Hoover, E. Brian Smith, and Ben Widom.  Carnahan's vision of molecular interactions and fluid behavior was strongly influenced by the works of Johannes Diderik van der Waals and by René Descartes.

Career

His interest in statistical mechanics, physics of fluids, molecular phenomena, and fundamentals of equations of state led to the development of the Carnahan-Starling equation of state. (1969) for the fluid phase of rigid nonattracting spheres, as single components and mixtures (Mansoori-Carnahan-Starling-Leland, 1971)

                    

Upon completion of his doctoral studies at University of Oklahoma, in 1971, he began a long research and teaching association with Professors Riki Kobayashi and Thomas W. Leland, Jr., at Rice University, in Houston, Texas.

In the 1980s, he resumed work on extending the Carnahan-Starling equation of state to systems of rigid nonattracting nonspherical particles.  Together with Professor Erich A. Muller, a series of papers were published in which a shape factor concept was incorporated to enable the equation developed for rigid sphere fluids to be extended to describe the fluid phase of many rigid nonattracting nonspherical particles.

References

Living people
1942 births
American chemical engineers
University of Houston alumni
University of Oklahoma alumni
Dow Chemical Company employees
Fellows of the American Institute of Chemical Engineers